Annavaram is a village in West Godavari district in the state of Andhra Pradesh in India.

Demographics
 India census, Annavaram has a population of 1396 of which 697 are males while 699 are females. The average sex ratio of Annavaram village is 1003. The child population is 128, which makes up 9.17% of the total population of the village, with sex ratio 969. In 2011, the literacy rate of Annavaram village was 74.37% when compared to 67.02% of Andhra Pradesh.

See also 
 Eluru

References 

Villages in West Godavari district